Laure Adler (née Laure Clauzet; born 11 March 1950, in Caen) is a French journalist, writer, publisher and radio/TV producer.

Works

Biographies 
 1986: L'Amour à l'arsenic : histoire de Marie Lafarge, Denoël.
 1998: Marguerite Duras, Éditions Gallimard
 2005: Dans les pas de Hannah Arendt, Gallimard
 2008: L'insoumise, Simone Weil, Actes Sud
 2011: Françoise, Grasset (on Françoise Giroud).
 2012: Dans les pas de Hannah Arendt, Gallimard
 2015: François Mitterrand, journées particulières, Flammarion

Essays 
 1979: À l'Aube du féminisme : les premières journalistes, Payot.
 1981: Misérable et glorieuse. La femme au XIXe siècle, under the direction of Jean-Paul Aron, Fayard.
 1983: Secrets d'alcôve : une histoire du couple de 1830 à 1930, Hachette Littératures.
 1987: Avignon : 40 ans de festival, with Alain Veinstein, Hachette.
 1990: La Vie quotidienne dans les maisons closes de 1830 à 1930, Hachette.
 1994: Les Femmes politiques, Le Seuil. 
 2006: Les femmes qui lisent sont dangereuses, with Stefan Bollmann, Flammarion.
 2007: Les femmes qui écrivent vivent dangereusement, with Stefan Bollmann, Flammarion.
 2008: Femmes hors du voile, photographs by Isabelle Eshraghi, éditions du Chêne.
 2009: Les femmes qui aiment sont dangereuses, with Elisa Lécosse, Flammarion.
 2010: La Beauté des nuits du monde by Marguerite Duras, texts selected and presented by Laure Adler, La Quinzaine littéraire, series "Voyager avec"
 2011: Les femmes qui lisent sont de plus en plus dangereuses, with Stefan Bollmann, Flammarion.
 2011: Manifeste féministe, éd. Autrement.
 2012: Le Bruit du monde, éditions Universitaires d'Avignon.
 2013: La Vie quotidienne dans les maisons closes, éditions Fayard.
 2016: Tous les soirs, éditions Actes Sud.

Tales 
 1995: , Flammarion (rééd. 2011, with a foreword).
 2001: À ce soir, Gallimard.

Novel 
 2013: Immortelles, Grasset.

Interviews 
 2002: Avant que la nuit ne vienne, with Pierre de Benouville, Grasset.
 2006: Jean-Pierre Chevènement : entretiens, éditions Michel de Maule. 
 2007: Starck, Philippe : entretiens, Flammarion.
 2007: J. Attali : entretiens, éditions Michel de Maule.
 2009: Le Théâtre, oui quand même, with Jacques Lassalle, éditions Universitaires d'Avignon.
 2009: Histoire de notre collection de tableaux - Pierre Bergé Yves Saint Laurent, with Pierre Bergé, Actes Sud.
 2009: La Passion de l'absolu, with George Steiner, éditions de l'Aube.
 2010: Roland Dumas : entretiens, éditions Michel de Maule.
 2011: Le Chemin de la vie, with Maurice Nadeau, .

Prefaces 
 2000: Une histoire du racisme : des origines à nos jours by Christian Delacampagne, Le Livre de Poche/France Culture.
 2002: Petites chroniques de la vie comme elle va by Étienne Gruillot, Éditions du Seuil.
 2003: Marguerite Duras et l'histoire by Stéphane Patrice, PUF.
 2004: Rwanda : un génocide oublié ? Un procès pour mémoire by Laure de Vulpian, Brussels, éditions Complexe. 
 2005: Les Deux Amants de Marie de France, Bruxelles, éditions Complexe.
 2010: Alain Crombecque. Au fil des rencontres by Christine Crombecque, postface, Actes Sud.
 2010: Voyage et gourmandises en pays Salers by Régine Rossi-Lagorce, éditions Mines de rien.
 2011: Dimanche et autres nouvelles by Irène Némirovsky, Le Livre de Poche.

Participations 
 1999: L'Illettrisme en toutes lettres. Textes, analyses, documents, entretiens, témoignages, éditions Flohic.
 2005: Paris. Au nom des femmes, Descartes & Cie.
 2006: L'Universel au féminin, tome 3, L'Harmattan.
 2008: Festival d'Aix : 1948-2008, Actes Sud.
 2010: Voyager avec Marguerite Duras, édition La Quinzaine littéraire.
 2010: Pensez, lisez. 40 livres pour rester intelligent !!!, Éditions Points.
 2012: Le Bruit du monde : le geste et la parole, éditions universitaires d'Avignon.

Decorations 
 Officer of the Legion of Honour, 31 December 2015

References

External links 

 

1950 births
Living people
French women journalists
French women essayists
20th-century French writers
French biographers
French feminists
French editors
French television presenters
French women television presenters
French radio presenters
French women radio presenters
Writers from Caen
Mass media people from Caen
Officiers of the Légion d'honneur
20th-century French essayists
20th-century French women writers
Women biographers